Andrew Wilson (born 1961) is a British historian and political scientist specializing in Eastern Europe, particularly  Ukraine. He is a Senior Policy Fellow at the European Council on Foreign Relations, and Professor in Ukrainian studies at the School of Slavonic and East European Studies at University College London. He wrote The Ukrainians: an Unexpected Nation and Virtual Politics: Faking Democracy in the Post-Soviet World.

Wilson is a member of the Ukraine Today media organization's International Supervisory Council.

He was born in Cumbria, United Kingdom.

Works
Ukraine: Perestroika to Independence (with Taras Kuzio), New York, St. Martin's Press, 1994, xiv, 260p. 
Ukrainian Nationalism in the 1990s: A Minority Faith, Cambridge University Press, 1996, xvii, 300p.   Can be searched at Google print
 The Ukrainians: Unexpected Nation, Yale University Press, 2000, xviii, 366p. , 2nd edition 2002 , 3rd edition 2009 , 4th edition 2015 
Virtual Politics: Faking Democracy in the Post-Soviet World, Yale University Press, 2005, 
Ukraine's Orange Revolution, Yale University Press, 2005, 
Belarus: The Last European Dictatorship, Yale University Press, 2012, 
Ukraine Crisis: What it Means for the West, Yale University Press, 2014,

References 

1961 births
Living people
Slavists
Ukrainianists
Historians of Ukraine